The American Professional Basketball League (APBL) was a semi-professional men's basketball league that began play in 2010. Originally known as the Atlantic Coast Professional Basketball League (ACPBL), the league changed its name before the 2012–13 season.  The league ceased operations after the 2019 season. Teams were located up and down the Atlantic Coast from New York to Northern Virginia.

History 
Formed in 2010 as the ACPBL, the league initially was made up of two teams (Buffalo Stampede, Washington GreenHawks) formerly of the Premier Basketball League, three teams (Beltway Bombers, Garden State Rebels, Tru Hope Trailblazers) formerly of the Eastern Basketball Alliance, and three expansion teams (Hudson Valley Kingz, New York Lions, Westchester Wildkatz).

For the 2016-17 season the APBL narrowed its footprint, with the majority of teams in the New York City metro area. Teams departing included the Bay Area Shuckers, Brooklyn Blazers, D.C. Funkhouse, NoVA Hawks, Rockville Victors and Winchester Storm. New teams joining for 2016–17: APBL United (a league-operated free agent team) and the New York Crusaders. Beltway Bombers captured their second league title in 2017 defeating APBL United 123-105 in the championship game.

Teams

Former teams 
 Bay Area Shuckers (2011–16)
 Brooklyn All Game (2012–14)
 Brooklyn Blazers (2012–16)
 Brooklyn Firebirds (2012–13)
 Buffalo Stampede (2010–11)
 Capital City Express (2012–14)
 D.C. Drew All Stars (2014)
 D.C. Funkhouse Piranhas (2013–16)
 Garden State Rebels (2010–12)
 Gotham City Revolution (2013–14)
 Hartford Lightning (2011–12)
 Hudson Valley Hype (2014)
 Hudson Valley Kingz (2010–16)
 Long Island United (2014)
 Metropolitan All-Stars (2012–14)
 New Jersey Thunder (2013–16)
 New York Lions (2010–11)
 North Jersey Pros (2011–12)
 NoVA Hawks (2012–16)
 Philadelphia Destroyers (2011–14)
Rockville Victors (2012–17)
 Toms River Shooters (2011–12)
 Tri-City Suns (2011)
 Tru Hope Trailblazers (2010–11)
 Washington GreenHawks (2010) - team dissolved and replaced by Tri-City Suns in January 2011
 Westchester Wildkatz (2010–11)
 Winchester Storm (2012–16)

Champions

Notable players 
Lonny Baxter, Rockville Victors

Adrian Bowie, Bay Area Shuckers

William "Smush" Parker, NYC 524

Chaz Williams, Brooklyn Blazers

References

External links 
 Official APBL website

 
Basketball leagues in the United States
Professional sports leagues in the United States
2010 establishments in the United States
Sports leagues established in 2010